Edward Wise (1632–1675) of Sydenham in the parish of Marystow in Devon, was a politician who sat in the House of Commons at various times between 1659 and 1675.

Wise was the son of Thomas Wise (c. 1605 – 1641) of Sydenham, MP, and was the grandson of Sir Thomas Wise (c. 1576 – 1630) of Sydenham, MP, and (via his mother) of Edward Chichester, 1st Viscount Chichester of Eggesford in Devon. In 1659 he was elected Member of Parliament for Okehampton in the Third Protectorate Parliament. He was elected in 1660 to the Convention Parliament. In 1661 he was re-elected MP for Okehampton for the Cavalier Parliament.

References 

Place of birth missing
English MPs 1659
English MPs 1660
English MPs 1661–1679
1632 births
1675 deaths
Members of the Parliament of England for Okehampton